André Rossignol (9 August 1890, Paris - 5 December 1960, Paris) was a French racing driver who became the first driver to win the 24 Hours of Le Mans twice, winning in consecutive years.

Career
The following year, Robert Bloch was assigned to drive with Rossignol, and the race was won once again, with all three Lorraine-Dietrichs finishing on the podium.

After Lorraine-Dietrich chose not to enter cars in the  event, Rossignol was hired by Chrysler and partnered with Henri Stoffel. The two finished the race in third place. Rossignol did not participate at Le Mans again.

Rossignol also competed in the 24 Hours of Spa, finishing second in 1925 and sixth in 1928 and 1929 but won in that year's race the class 5.0 in an Chrysler 75 together with Henri Stoffel..

Racing record

Complete 24 Hours of Le Mans results

External links 
André Rossignol at racingsportscars.com.

Literature 
 R. M . Clarke: Le Mans – die Bentley & Alfa Years 1923–1939 Brocklands Books 1999, .

1890 births
1960 deaths
French racing drivers
24 Hours of Le Mans drivers
24 Hours of Le Mans winning drivers